Silver Firs is a census-designated place (CDP) in Snohomish County, Washington, United States.  The population was 20,891 at the 2010 census.  It lies northeast of the city of Mill Creek. Silver Firs is one of two CDPs that were created out of the former Seattle Hill-Silver Firs CDP in 2010, the other being Eastmont.

Based on per capita income, one of the more reliable measures of affluence, Silver Firs ranks 69th of 522 areas in the state of Washington to be ranked.

Geography
Silver Firs is located at  (47.881010, -122.178697).

According to the United States Census Bureau, the CDP has a total area of 14.0 square miles (36.2 km2), of which, 13.9 square miles (36.1 km2) of it is land and 0.04 square miles (0.1 km2) of it (0.21%) is water.

The CDP contains several large residential neighborhoods, including Silver Firs and the Highlands.

Demographics

As of the census of 2000, there were 35,311 people, 11,633 households, and 9,794 families residing in the CDP. The population density was 2,530.8 people per square mile (977.3/km2). There were 11,893 housing units at an average density of 852.4/sq mi (329.2/km2). The racial makeup of the CDP was 86.05% White, 1.16% African American, 0.63% Native American, 7.53% Asian, 0.22% Pacific Islander, 1.27% from other races, and 3.15% from two or more races. Hispanic or Latino of any race were 3.02% of the population.

There were 11,633 households, out of which 48.0% had children under the age of 18 living with them, 74.4% were married couples living together, 6.9% had a female householder with no husband present, and 15.8% were non-families. 11.2% of all households were made up of individuals, and 3.1% had someone living alone who was 65 years of age or older. The average household size was 3.03 and the average family size was 3.28.

In the CDP, the age distribution of the population shows 31.1% under the age of 18, 5.7% from 18 to 24, 35.5% from 25 to 44, 21.6% from 45 to 64, and 6.1% who were 65 years of age or older. The median age was 35 years. For every 100 females, there were 99.9 males. For every 100 females age 18 and over, there were 97.3 males.

The median income for a household in the CDP was $72,554, and the median income for a family was $74,878. Males had a median income of $52,188 versus $35,726 for females. The per capita income for the CDP was $26,617. About 1.8% of families and 3.1% of the population were below the poverty line, including 3.8% of those under age 18 and 6.3% of those age 65 or over.

References

Census-designated places in Snohomish County, Washington
Census-designated places in Washington (state)